Scavengers of the Mutant World is a 1988 video game published by Interstel Corporation.

Gameplay
Scavengers of the Mutant World is a game in which a tribe of humans lives in the ruins of Lau and their young people forage among the other post-nuclear-destruction ruins for anything.

Reception
Scorpia reviewed the game for Computer Gaming World, and stated that "Interstel may have attempted the impossible in trying to create a CRPG with replayability. Unfortunately, the rather limited goal of the game and the lack of a definite plotline works against it. In effect, players end up with a diversion rather than an absorbing adventure. The good idea ends up being torpedoed by everything that comes before."

Bruce E. Wiley for Quest Busters said "most of my negative feelings weren't the program's fault, but due to my disappointment with the game's failure to deliver on the packaging's promises. Scavengers is a nice, simple RPG that beginners will find enjoyable and interesting."

References

External links
Review in Game Players PC Strategy Guide

1988 video games
DOS games
DOS-only games
Fictional mutants
Open-world video games
Post-apocalyptic video games
Role-playing video games
Survival video games
Video games developed in the United States